Mandeok-dong may refer to:

 Mandeok-dong, Busan
 Mandeok-dong, Yeosu